The Ape was a British biplane experimental aeroplane built by Armstrong Whitworth Aircraft in the early 1920s and first flown on 5 January 1926 to "answer all the questions of aerodynamics."

Development
The aircraft was designed to be "infinitely" adjustable: The fuselage could be lengthened or shortened, different fins and tailplanes could be fitted, the incidence angle of both the tailplane and the wings could be altered and the wings could be additionally changed in stagger, rake and dihedral. However, it could not be converted to a monoplane configuration, nor be fitted with a more powerful engine. Additionally, the entire tail was a single unit and the incidence angle of the tailplane could not be changed without also changing that of the fin. It was equipped with a comparatively small  Lynx engine that did not deliver nearly as much power as the relatively heavy plane needed, and certainly prohibited the Ape from experimenting to its full potential. The second Ape had a bigger engine, the Bristol Jupiter, but additional gadgets added weight that mostly negated the extra power.

The Ape would continue to see occasional use throughout the 1920s.

Operators
 
 Royal Aircraft Establishment

Specifications (First Ape)

See also

References

 Tapper, Oliver. Armstrong Whitworth Aircraft since 1913. London:Putnam, 1988. .

1920s British experimental aircraft
Ape
Biplanes
Aircraft first flown in 1926
Single-engined tractor aircraft
Conventional landing gear